Aultmore (from Scottish Gaelic "An t-Allt Mòr", meaning the "Big Burn") is a village in Moray, Scotland, near Keith.

References

Villages in Moray